Wisbech North railway station was a station serving the town of Wisbech, Cambridgeshire. It was part of the Midland and Great Northern Joint Railway and was of two stations serving the town. The other was Wisbech East on the line from March to Watlington also known as the Bramley Line. Wisbech North station was located just off of Harecroft Road near a small housing estate called "Cricketers Way".

History
Located on Harecroft Road, it was on the line between Sutton Bridge and Peterborough which was closed in 1959 by British Railways.

See also

Wisbech East railway station

References

Disused railway stations in Cambridgeshire
Former Midland and Great Northern Joint Railway stations
Railway stations in Great Britain opened in 1866
Railway stations in Great Britain closed in 1959
1866 establishments in England
Wisbech
1959 disestablishments in England